Post-Nothing is the debut studio album by Canadian rock duo Japandroids.

The album was originally released in Canada on April 28, 2009 by Unfamiliar Records. Pitchfork awarded 'Best New Music' to both the album and lead single "Young Hearts Spark Fire", helping to expose the band to a large audience outside of Canada. Japandroids were subsequently signed to Polyvinyl, who re-released the album worldwide on August 4, 2009.

Background
The band self-financed the recording of Post-Nothing in the summer of 2008, with the intention of self-releasing it in 2009. However, by the fall of 2008, King and Prowse had become convinced that the band was going nowhere, and mutually decided to call it quits at the end of the year. It was agreed that they would self-release the album early in 2009, but would not promote it.

In January 2009, Japandroids signed to independent Canadian label Unfamiliar Records, who were eager to release the album, despite the band's reservations about continuing. Frustrated by label interest only after they had decided to break-up, King and Prowse reluctantly agreed to continue Japandroids temporarily, and began performing live again. In March 2009, taste-making website Pitchfork awarded the song "Young Hearts Spark Fire" a 'Best New Music' designation, instantly exposing the band to a large audience outside of Canada.

Release and promotion

Post-Nothing was released in Canada on April 28, 2009 by Unfamiliar Records, originally on vinyl only (Unfamiliar had offered to press Post-Nothing on either CD or LP, but not both, with the band opting for an LP release). Pitchfork immediately championed the album, awarding it a 'Best New Music' designation, and praising its rawness, energy and reckless abandon. Japandroids were subsequently signed to Polyvinyl Record Co. in June 2009. On June 16, 2009, Japandroids recorded a live in-studio session at KEXP in Seattle. On July 20, 2009, “Wet Hair“ was released as a single in Europe to promote the album ahead of its release, as well as Japandroids’ first-ever European tour. The album was  re-released worldwide by Polyvinyl on August 4, 2009.

In October, 2009, Japandroids performed their first-ever shows in the UK with a 4-night stand in London, including an in-store performance at Rough Trade East. On January 4, 2010, Japandroids made their television debut, performing the song "Wet Hair" on Late Night with Jimmy Fallon. In March, 2010, the band made their first of many SXSW appearances, performing 8 shows over 4 days in Austin. On April 16, 2010, the band recorded an episode of Morning Becomes Eclectic at KCRW in Los Angeles, which included a 6-song live in-studio performance. On June 16, 2010, the band performed "Young Hearts Spark Fire”, "Art Czars”, and "Younger Us" on MTV Live. On August 15, 2010, Japandroids’ show at The Fonda Theatre in Hollywood was filmed by Last Call with Carson Daly, with their performances of ”Young Hearts Spark Fire" and “Art Czars” airing during episodes on September 30, 2010 and November 16, 2010 respectively.

Tour
Japandroids toured extensively to promote the album, earning praise for their energetic live performances. The Post-Nothing Tour consisted of 9 individual legs, and included over 200 shows in more than 20 countries. While primarily headlining their own shows, Japandroids also supporting acts such as A Place To Bury Strangers and Health in Europe, and The Walkmen in North America.<ref>BrooklynVegan Staff. “Japandroids add a 2nd Merc show – updated 2009 Tour Dates”, BrooklynVegan’’, 15 September 2009. Retrieved on 05 February 2019.</ref>

Following a handful of warm-up shows in Vancouver and an appearance at CMW in Toronto, Japandroids' first full-scale North American tour was originally scheduled to begin on April 23, 2009 in Calgary. After performing one show, they were forced to postpone and reschedule the remainder of the tour due to a health emergency. On the morning of April 24, 2009, King was checked into Calgary's Foothills Medical Center to undergo emergency surgery for a life-threatening perforated ulcer. Touring resumed June 13, 2009 after King's recovery with a performance at Vancouver's Music Waste festival, and continued uninterrupted through to the final show October 27, 2010 at Maxwell's in Hoboken, New Jersey.

The Post-Nothing Tour informally ended with two performances at Schubas Tavern in Chicago, on December 31, 2010, and January 1, 2011. Following these performances, Japandroids returned to Vancouver to begin work on their second album, and did not perform live again until August 2011.

Among the dates of the Post-Nothing Tour were numerous festival appearances, including Sled Island, North by Northeast, Pop Montreal, Hillside Festival, Osheaga Festival, and Halifax Pop Explosion in Canada, Pitchfork Music Festival, Siren Music Festival, South by Southwest, Sasquatch!, Bonnaroo, Bumbershoot, Musicfest NW, and Capitol Hill Block Party in the United States, and The Great Escape, Roskilde, Pohoda Festival, Hove Festival and Primavera Sound in Europe.Cosores, Phillip. "Japandroids rule; will continue to rule throughout summer", Consequence of Sound, 10 June 2010. Retrieved on 05 February 2019.

7"s
Initially, the band had desired to include several more tracks on the album, but were unable due to insufficient funds. Many of the un-included tracks that the duo had written for the album were later recorded and released in 2010 as series of limited edition 7" singles. These tracks include "Art Czars", "Younger Us", and "Heavenward Grand Prix". In an interview with The Village Voice, King explained the concept, and how the Post-Nothing Tour affected their release:

Japandroids had originally planned to release five singles, but abandoned the project after only three in order to focus on writing and recording their second album. A fourth 7" single, their final for Polyvinyl, was eventually released on May 15, 2012 for "The House That Heaven Built", the lead single from their second album Celebration Rock.

ReceptionPost-Nothing was released to critical acclaim in Canada, with Exclaim! naming it the second best album of 2009. The album was long-listed for the Polaris Music Prize and nominated for Alternative Album of the Year at the Juno Awards.Juno Awards Juno Awards: 2010 Nominees, Juno Awards, March 3, 2010. Retrieved on 05 February 2019.

The album was also well-received internationally, appearing on many year-end lists, including those of Pitchfork (#15), Spin (#16), NME (#39), The A.V. Club (#25), PopMatters (#35), and Stereogum (#21).

The album peaked at number 22 on the Billboard'' Top Heatseekers Albums chart.

Track listing

Singles
 "Young Hearts Spark Fire" (March 9, 2009)
 Digital download (US)
 "Wet Hair" (July 20, 2009)
 Digital download (UK/EU)
 CD single b/w: "Young Hearts Spark Fire" (UK/EU)

Personnel
Japandroids
 Brian King – guitar, lead vocals (1,2,3,5,6,7,8), backup vocals (4)
 David Prowse – drums, backup vocals (1,2,3,5,6,7), lead vocals (4)

Technical personnel
 Jesse Gander – engineering

References

2009 debut albums
Japandroids albums
Polyvinyl Record Co. albums